Edward McCabe may refer to:

Edward P. McCabe (1850–1920), American politician
Edward MacCabe (1816–1885), Cardinal of Dublin
Edward A. McCabe (1917–2008), aide to President Dwight Eisenhower